Nizhnyaya Vereyka is a rural locality (a selo) in Sklyayevskoye Rural Settlement, Ramonsky District, Voronezh Oblast, Russia. The population was 108 as of 2010. There are 4 streets.

Geography 
Nizhnyaya Vereyka is located on the Bolshaya Vereyka River, 33 km northwest of Ramon (the district's administrative centre) by road. Sklyayevo is the nearest rural locality.

References 

Rural localities in Ramonsky District